The Korean Revolution Museum, located in Pyongyang, North Korea, was founded on August 1, 1948, and holds a large exhibition of items related to Kim Il-sung and the Korean revolutionary movement. It is situated behind the Mansu Hill Grand Monument and is adjacent to the Mansudae Assembly Hall, seat of the Supreme People's Assembly, the North Korean legislature.

The Korean Revolution Museum encompasses the period between 1860 and the present day, including the anti-Japanese resistance, the Korean War and the period of socialist construction. It has 90 rooms which hold items related to Kim Il-sung and his associates, Korean reunification, the Korean diaspora, and various historical battles. Since its establishment, it has had 27 million visitors from North Korea and abroad. At 240,000 square metres, it is also one of the largest structures in the world. The museum underwent major renovations which were completed in 2017. A new exhibition hall was opened in 2022 to mark the 10th anniversary of Kim Jong-un's rise to power.

See also 

 List of museums in North Korea

References

Further reading 

 
 
 
 

Museums in Pyongyang
1948 establishments in Korea
Museums established in 1948